Aizoago is a fungal genus in the family Ustilaginaceae. Circumscribed in 2013, it contains two species of smut fungi found in Australia. Aizoago tetragoniae grows on Tetragonia diptera, while A. tetragonioides grows on Tetragonia tetragonioides.

References

External links

Ustilaginomycotina